Hoagy Sings Carmichael (subtitled With the Pacific Jazzmen arranged and conducted by Johnny Mandel) is an album by composer and vocalist Hoagy Carmichael recorded in 1956 and released on the Pacific Jazz label. The album features Carmichael's last significant recordings.

Reception

The Allmusic review by Scott Yanow states: "What is unusual is that he is accompanied by an 11-piece all-star jazz group and that his voice takes its turn with trumpeters Harry "Sweets" Edison and Don Fagerquist, altoist Art Pepper, and pianist Jimmy Rowles. The match up works quite well, for Hoagy's songs have long been viable devices for jazz improvising".

Track listing
All compositions by Hoagy Carmichael except as indicated
 "Georgia on My Mind" (Hoagy Carmichael, Stuart Gorrell) – 3:58
 "Winter Moon" – 4:12
 "New Orleans" – 3:55
 "Memphis in June" (Carmichael, Paul Francis Webster) – 3:48
 "Skylark" (Carmichael, Johnny Mercer) – 4:03
 "Two Sleepy People" (Carmichael, Frank Loesser) – 4:35
 "Baltimore Oriole" (Carmichael, Webster) – 3:54
 "Rockin' Chair" – 2:34
 "Ballad in Blue" (Carmichael, Irving Kahal) – 3:07
 "Lazy River" (Carmichael, Sidney Arodin) – 2:48
 "Georgia on My Mind" (Carmichael, Gorrell) – 1:47 Bonus track on CD reissue
Recorded at the Forum Theatre in Los Angeles, CA on September 10 (tracks 1, 3, 7 & 11), September 11 (tracks 4, 6 & 10) and September 13 (tracks 2, 5, 8 & 9), 1956

Personnel
Hoagy Carmichael – vocals
Harry Edison (tracks 1, 3, 4, 6, 7, 10 & 11), Conrad Gozzo (tracks 1, 3, 4, 6, 7, 10 & 11), Don Fagerquist (tracks 2, 5, 8 & 9), Ray Linn (tracks 2, 5, 8 & 9) – trumpet
Jimmy Zito – bass trumpet
Harry Klee, Art Pepper – alto saxophone
Mort Friedman – tenor saxophone
Marty Berman – baritone saxophone
Jimmy Rowles – piano
Al Hendrickson – guitar
Joe Mondragon (tracks 1–3, 5, 7–9 & 11), Ralph Pena (tracks 4, 6 & 10) – bass
Irving Cottler (tracks 1, 3, 4, 6, 7, 10 & 11), Nick Fatool (tracks 2, 5, 8 & 9) – drums
Johnny Mandel – arranger, conductor

References

1957 albums
Albums arranged by Johnny Mandel
Albums conducted by Johnny Mandel
Hoagy Carmichael albums
Pacific Jazz Records albums
Self-covers albums